Daedalium (or Dedalium or, earlier, Omphale) was an ancient city of Sicily along the south coast road between Akragas (modern Agrigento) and Phintias (modern Licata).  It was the citadel of Philaris.

References
Hazlitt, Classical Gazetteer

Colonies of Magna Graecia
Roman towns and cities in Italy
Ancient cities in Sicily
Former populated places in Italy